800 mm gauge railways are narrow-gauge railways built to a track gauge of .

Whilst this gauge is uncommon amongst adhesion railways, some of the world's best known rack railways are built to it. Six of these are in Switzerland, including the world's steepest rack line (the Pilatus Railway) and the world's longest pure rack line (the Wengernalp Railway), whilst the United Kingdom's only rack railway (the Snowdon Mountain Railway) is also to this gauge. A few funicular railways are also built to this gauge.

Installations

See also

List of track gauges

References